The Sturgeon River is a  river located in central Alberta. It is a major tributary of the North Saskatchewan River. The river crosses Sturgeon County, which was named for this river. For much of its length, the Sturgeon is the northwestern-most major river in the Hudson Bay drainage basin, as the river runs close to and parallel to the Arctic Divide.

At the Villeneuve station, Sturgeon River has a discharge of 0.4 to 3 m3/s.

Fish species which may be found in the river include:  walleye, pike, perch, burbot, goldeye, sturgeon, whitefish, and sauger.

Course

Tributaries
Rivière Qui Barre
Atim Creek
Little Egg Creek

Numerous lakes are found in the upper watershed, including Isle Lake, Lac Ste. Anne, Birch Lake, Sandy Lake, Deadman Lake, Matchayaw Lake, Gladu Lake, Atim Lake and Big Lake.

See also
List of Alberta rivers

References

The Sturgeon River Watershed

Rivers of Alberta
North Saskatchewan River